Scenic Road station is a SEPTA Route 101 trolley stop in Springfield Township, Delaware County, Pennsylvania. It is officially located near Scenic and Rolling Roads.

Trolleys arriving at this station travel between 69th Street Terminal in Upper Darby, Pennsylvania and Orange Street in Media, Pennsylvania. The station has a shed with a roof where people can go inside when it is raining. Free parking is available at this station. Scenic Road is at the north end of Walsh Park, a   natural environmental center with picnic tables, playground equipment, and various athletic fields. It is also located south of Indian Rock Park, a  natural environmental park in Drexel Hill, containing picnic tables, playground equipment, basketball courts, and Darby Creek.

Station layout

References

External links

Rt. 101/102 - Media/Sharon Hill, by Bob Wright (World-NYC Subway.org)

SEPTA Media–Sharon Hill Line stations